Gerhard Urain (born 30 August 1972, in Rottenmann) is an Austrian cross-country skier. He represented Austria at the 1998 Winter Olympics in Nagano. At the 2002 Winter Olympics in Salt Lake City he placed fourth in the relay with the Austrian team.

Cross-country skiing results
All results are sourced from the International Ski Federation (FIS).

Olympic Games

World Championships

World Cup

Season standings

Team podiums

 1 victory 
 4 podiums

References

External links

1972 births
Living people
Austrian male cross-country skiers
Cross-country skiers at the 1998 Winter Olympics
Cross-country skiers at the 2002 Winter Olympics
Olympic cross-country skiers of Austria
People from Liezen District
Sportspeople from Styria
20th-century Austrian people
21st-century Austrian people